In geometry, John Horton Conway defines architectonic and catoptric tessellations as the uniform tessellations (or honeycombs) of Euclidean 3-space with prime space groups and their duals, as three-dimensional analogue of the Platonic, Archimedean, and Catalan tiling of the plane. The singular vertex figure of an architectonic tessellation is the dual of the cell of catoptric tessellation. The cubille is the only Platonic (regular) tessellation of 3-space, and is self-dual. There are other uniform honeycombs constructed as gyrations or prismatic stacks (and their duals) which are excluded from these categories.

Enumeration
The pairs of architectonic and catoptric tessellations are listed below with their symmetry group. These tessellations only represent four symmetry space groups, and also all within the cubic crystal system. Many of these tessellations can be defined in multiple symmetry groups, so in each case the highest symmetry is expressed.

Vertex Figures 
The vertex figures of all architectonic honeycombs, and the dual cells of all catoptric honeycombs are shown below, at the same scale and the same orientation:

Symmetry

These four symmetry groups are labeled as:

References

 Crystallography of Quasicrystals: Concepts, Methods and Structures by Walter Steurer, Sofia Deloudi (2009), p. 54-55. 12 packings of 2 or more uniform polyhedra with cubic symmetry

Further reading

 
 Branko Grünbaum, (1994) Uniform tilings of 3-space. Geombinatorics 4, 49 - 56.
 Norman Johnson (1991) Uniform Polytopes, Manuscript
 A. Andreini, (1905) Sulle reti di poliedri regolari e semiregolari e sulle corrispondenti reti correlative (On the regular and semiregular nets of polyhedra and on the corresponding correlative nets), Mem. Società Italiana della Scienze, Ser.3, 14 75–129. PDF 
 George Olshevsky, (2006) Uniform Panoploid Tetracombs, Manuscript PDF 

 Kaleidoscopes: Selected Writings of H. S. M. Coxeter, edited by F. Arthur Sherk, Peter McMullen, Anthony C. Thompson, Asia Ivic Weiss, Wiley-Interscience Publication, 1995,  
 (Paper 24) H.S.M. Coxeter, Regular and Semi-Regular Polytopes III, [Math. Zeit. 200 (1988) 3-45] See p318 

Honeycombs (geometry)
John Horton Conway